Nathalie Elgrably-Lévy is an economics teacher and a writer. She holds an M.Sc. in Commerce from HEC Montréal, with a specialization in applied Economics and a thesis on the federal budget deficit. Elgrably-Lévy is primarily interested by the evaluation of public policy.

Career
Elgrably-Lévy is a full-time lecturer at HEC Montréal since 1992. She also taught economics for several years at the University of Montreal and at UQAM. She is a Senior Economist at the Montreal Economic Institute. She is the author of La face cachée des politiques publiques, published in 2006 by Les Éditions Logiques. Elgrably-Lévy produced a Quebec adaptation of the 6th edition of Microeconomics, by Pyndick and Rubinfeld. She is also a columnist for Le Journal de Montréal and Le Journal de Québec. In 2008, she worked as a Senior Economist at the Fraser Institute. One of Elgrably-Levy paper on the minimum wage was criticized by Sylvain Sauvé over ideological neutrality.

Publications

Book

Articles
All columns published in the "Journal de Montréal" and the "Journal de Québec" are available on the Montreal Economic Institute (MEI) website: Éditoriaux Chroniques Le Journal de Montreal

Partial list of the studies Nathalie Elgrably-Lévy realized for the MEI:
 "International aid: How to encourage development in poor countries?", Montreal Economic Institute, February 2008. URL: 
 "The minimum wage and labour market flexibility", Montreal Economic Institute, December 2006. URL: 
 "Are business subsidies efficient?", Montreal Economic Institute, June 2006. URL:

References

External links
 Montreal Economic Institute
 Fraser Institute
 HEC Montréal
 Journal de Montréal

Canadian non-fiction writers in French
Canadian economists
Writers from Quebec
Living people
Canadian women economists
Academic staff of HEC Montréal
Academic staff of the Université de Montréal
Academic staff of the Université du Québec à Montréal
HEC Montréal alumni
Canadian libertarians
21st-century Canadian non-fiction writers
21st-century Canadian women writers
Canadian women non-fiction writers
Year of birth missing (living people)
Quebecor people